Semela Ridge (‘Rid Semela’ \'rid se-'me-la\ is the ice-covered ridge extending 8.5 km in east-west direction and 3.2 km wide, rising to 2026 m in the west foothills of Bruce Plateau on Loubet Coast in Graham Land, Antarctica.  It has steep and partly ice-free south, west and north slopes, and surmounts Erskine Glacier to the south and west, and Byway Glacier to the north.

The ridge is named after the Thracian goddess Semela.

Location
British mapping in 1976.

Maps
British Antarctic Territory. Scale 1:200000 topographic map. DOS 610 Series, Sheet W 66 64. Directorate of Overseas Surveys, Tolworth, UK, 1976.
 Antarctic Digital Database (ADD). Scale 1:250000 topographic map of Antarctica. Scientific Committee on Antarctic Research (SCAR). Since 1993, regularly upgraded and updated.

Notes

References
 Bulgarian Antarctic Gazetteer. Antarctic Place-names Commission. (details in Bulgarian, basic data in English)
Semela Ridge. SCAR Composite Gazetteer of Antarctica.

External links
 Semela Ridge. Copernix satellite image

Ridges of Graham Land
Bulgaria and the Antarctic
Loubet Coast